Sven Kærup Bjørneboe (born 11 June 1943) is a Norwegian essayist. He was born in Kristiansand, and is a nephew of writer Jens Bjørneboe.

His first essay collection was Brud og Brudgom from 1967. Among his other collections are I tvillingens tegn from 1970, Flukten til det virkelige from 1984, Om opprør og opprørsånd from 1989, and Oss svermere imellom from 1993. He was awarded the Brage Prize in 1996 for the essay Jerusalem. En sentimental reise.

References

1943 births
Living people
People from Kristiansand
Norwegian essayists